A boomkin, bumkin, or bumpkin is a short spar that may project either fore or aft on a sailing vessel, depending on its function.  Traditionally, it was a strong, usually wooden spar extending forward over the bow of a Western sailing ship holding a block through which the tack of the foresail was passed; on some modern sailing yachts with long main booms it is a short spar extending aft from the stern anchoring a central backstay.

Historically, boomkins were employed in pairs, one on either side of the vessel, often canted downwards over the main head-rail.  Originally butted at their inboard ends against a knighthead, bolting prevailed since the end of the 18th century.

They are not to be confused with catheads, heavy wooden beams on either side of a traditional vessel's bow angled forward at roughly 45 degrees which support the ship's anchors when being raised or lowered.

History
Traditional boomkins found on English sailing vessels gradually evolved from 1710 until around 1850.
 1730–1780 CE: The boomkin grew longer, with an octagonal inboard end and a circular outboard end tapering to 3/4 its initial diameter by its tip.
 1780–1805 CE: The boomkin often became circular in cross section from base to tip.
 1805 CE: The boomkin's inboard end was made half-round and generally bolted to rather than butted against the knighthead.  An iron band with eyelets for (typically three) boomkin shrouds was also introduced.
 1825 CE: The boomkin reverted to being square-edged, usually one inch wider than it was high. It also gained an additional eyelet for securing a slip.
 1850 CE and beyond: The boomkin began to appear at a vessel's stern to provide either an attachment point for a backstay or the sheet of sail flown from a mizzen mast.
 1967: Drascombe Lugger yawls designed with boomkins as an attachment point for sail flown from the mizzen.

References

External links
 Drascombe Lugger yawl

Sailboat components
Sailing rigs and rigging
Nautical terminology